Charles Magill (July 10, 1759 – April 18, 1827) was a United States circuit judge of the United States Circuit Court for the Fourth Circuit.

Education and career

Born on April 15, 1759, in County Kerry, Ireland, Magill read law. He served in the Continental Army as a colonel during the American Revolutionary War. He entered private practice in Winchester, Virginia from 1785 to 1789, and until 1799. He was a deputy state's attorney in Frederick County, Virginia starting in 1789. He was a member of the Senate of Virginia from 1799 to 1800.

Federal judicial service

Magill was nominated by President John Adams on February 25, 1801, to a seat on the United States Circuit Court for the Fourth Circuit vacated by Judge Philip Barton Key. He was confirmed by the United States Senate on February 26, 1801, and received his commission on March 3, 1801. His service terminated on July 1, 1802, due to abolition of the court.

Later career

Following his departure from the federal bench, Magill resumed private practice in Winchester from 1802 to 1804. He was the Mayor of Winchester in 1805. He was in private practice and a planter in Winchester from 1806 to 1827.

Death

Magill died on April 18, 1827, in Winchester.

References

Sources
 

1759 births
1827 deaths
18th-century American lawyers
19th-century American judges
19th-century American lawyers
19th-century American politicians
Continental Army officers from Virginia
Judges of the United States circuit courts
People from County Antrim
Mayors of Winchester, Virginia
United States federal judges appointed by John Adams
Virginia state senators
United States federal judges admitted to the practice of law by reading law
American planters
Virginia lawyers